Bianca Rose Garcia (born June 1986) is an American politician from the state of New Hampshire. A Republican, she served in the New Hampshire House of Representatives from 2012 through 2014.

Biography 
Garcia graduated from the Curtis Institute of Music in 2006 with a bachelor's degree. She then enrolled at the New England Conservatory of Music, receiving her master's degree in 2008. She was a Fulbright Scholar in 2009, and studied in Rome.

Garcia plays the flute in "The Seraphim Duo" with Marilinda Garcia, her sister and a fellow former New Hampshire representative, who plays the harp.

References

External links
 
 

1986 births
Living people
Curtis Institute of Music alumni
New England Conservatory alumni
American flautists
American people of Italian descent
American people of Spanish descent
Republican Party members of the New Hampshire House of Representatives
Date of birth missing (living people)
Place of birth missing (living people)
Musicians from New Hampshire
Hispanic and Latino American women in politics
Women flautists
21st-century American women musicians
21st-century flautists